For the Winter Olympics there are currently eight venues that have been designated for snowboarding competitions.

References

Venues
 
Snowboarding